The Lego Movie 2: The Second Part is a 2019 computer-animated adventure comedy film produced by Warner Animation Group, Lego System A/S, Rideback, Lord Miller Productions, and Vertigo Entertainment, and distributed by Warner Bros. Pictures. It was directed by Mike Mitchell from a screenplay by Phil Lord and Christopher Miller. The film is the sequel to The Lego Movie (2014) and the fourth installment in The Lego Movie franchise, while being the last film of the series produced and distributed by Warner Bros. Pictures. The film stars Chris Pratt, Elizabeth Banks, Will Arnett, Charlie Day, Alison Brie, Nick Offerman, and Will Ferrell reprising their roles from the previous film, while new cast members include Stephanie Beatriz, Tiffany Haddish, and Maya Rudolph. In addition to Pratt reprising his role, he also voiced the new character. A collaboration between production houses from the United States, Australia, and Denmark, the film takes place five years after the events of Taco Tuesday and follows Emmet Brickowski (Pratt), Lucy (Banks) and their friends, who take into the Systar System to test their skills and creativity, while Emmet's dealing with a coming cataclysm known as "Armamageddon".

Plans for a sequel to The Lego Movie began in February 2014 and was announced to be in the works, four days before the release of the first film. It was announced that the film would be directed by Chris McKay while Phil Lord and Christopher Miller remained as writers and producers in March 2014. The film since underwent many changes, such as rewrites, directors, and release dates, with Mike Mitchell was later announced as the new director in February 2017. Production for the film began in October 2017, with the majority of the cast members returning to voice the characters in mid-2018, alongside with the new cast. As with all its previous instalments in the franchise, the animation was provided by Animal Logic. To improve on-screen detail and depth-of-field, the production of the film took advantage of the latest update to its trace renderer Glimpse. Mark Mothersbaugh, who composed The Lego Movie and The Lego Ninjago Movie, returned to composed the film's musical score, with artists such as Dillon Francis, Beck, Robyn and The Lonely Island performing new original songs for the film.

The Lego Movie 2: The Second Part premiered in Los Angeles on February 2, 2019, and was released in the United States on February 8, 2019, in RealD 3D, IMAX, IMAX 3D, 4DX and Dolby Cinema formats. It received generally positive reviews from critics, who commended its humor, animation, premise, soundtrack, and voice acting, although some said it was not as "fresh" as the first film. Despite grossing $192.5 million worldwide against a budget of $99 million, the film became the franchise's second box office disappointment after The Lego Ninjago Movie, which led Warner Bros. to sell the rights of The Lego Movie franchise to Universal Pictures, which was later set for a five-year deal. A third film is in development.

Plot 

Shortly after the invasion led by Lord Business in which Emmet destroys the Kragle using the Piece of Resistance, Duplo aliens arrive in the Lego universe and threaten destruction. Emmet builds the aliens a heart as a token of friendship, but one eats it and demands more. Lucy and the Master Builders believe this to be an attack and retaliate, and the ensuing battle ravages Bricksburg.

Five years after the events of the first film, the teenaged Finn has rebuilt Bricksburg as "Apocalypseburg". Within the Lego universe, they have been ravaged by repeated Duplo attacks, and several of their friends have gone missing searching for the Duplo home planet. Emmet remains upbeat in stark contrast to Lucy and his friends, though he has visions of an impending "armamageddon". A mini-doll called General Sweet Mayhem arrives, kidnaps all of Emmet's friends, and takes them to the shape-shifting empress of the "Systar System", Queen Watevra Wa'Nabi. Emmet tries to convince the Master Builders to help him save Lucy and the rest of his friends, but they refuse to help, believing that he isn't tough enough to go through the Systar System. Emmet subsequently crafts a spaceship to pursue Mayhem by passing through the "Stairgate". Meanwhile, Wa'Nabi can seemingly brainwash Emmet's friends into accepting the joy of her world, and convinces Batman to marry her as a way to unite the Lego and Duplo worlds, with only Lucy remaining skeptical of Wa'Nabi's plans.

Emmet's ship is heavily damaged and nearly collides with an asteroid field, but is saved in time by rugged adventurer Rex Dangervest. After hearing Emmet's story, Rex offers to help and takes them to the Systar System, and en route, Emmet tries to emulate some of Rex's mannerisms. When they arrive, they quickly reunite with Lucy and learn of the marriage plans, which Rex insists must be a front to bring on "armamageddon".

As the wedding starts, Emmet, Rex, and Lucy split up to sabotage the event. Mayhem, who insists the wedding is intended to prevent "armamageddon", intercepts Lucy instead, and explains their true intentions. At the ceremony, Wa'Nabi reveals her true form: the heart that Emmet tried to give the Duplo invaders.  Realizing that Mayhem is right, Lucy tries to stop Emmet, but he crashes the ceremony. In reality, Finn, after finding that Bianca had taken his Lego figures, has smashed her own creations. Emmet realizes his mistake, but is seized by Rex, who reveals he is a version of himself from the future. Rex had collided with the asteroids, and ended up under the dryer, forgotten by Finn. To ensure his future existence, he changed his appearance and created a time-travel machine to return to help Emmet but make sure "armamageddon" came to pass. When Emmet refuses to abandon his friends, Rex knocks him under the same dryer, ensuring that he would continue to exist.

In the real world, Finn and Bianca's mother is fed up with the kids' bickering, and as punishment, orders them to put the Lego toys into the storage bin; Lucy recognizes this as Emmet's "armamageddon" (as in "our mama gets in"). Both the Lego and Duplo figures are put into the "Bin of Storajj" and fear they will not escape.

Meanwhile, Finn finds the pieces of Wa'Nabi's form in one of the storage bins, which is revealed to be a heart that Finn gave to Bianca five years earlier, telling her it can be "whatever you want it to be". Finn and Bianca reconcile and start playing together. In the Lego universe, this act inspires Lucy and the others to escape the Bin and help rebuild Wa'Nabi's world. Lucy then saves Emmet from Rex, destroying the time machine in the process. Emmet comes to accept he will never be as skilled as Rex, and with this self-realization, Rex fades from existence, correcting a time paradox.

Finn and Bianca's mother sees them playing together, and happily watches them. The Lego universe is recreated as a mish-mash of Apocalypseburg and the Systar System, renamed "Syspocalypstar". When Emmet's home is rebuilt, the film ends with Lucy making Emmet a gift of the original album of "Everything Is Awesome", revealing that she co-originated the song, causing Emmet to gasp in  shock.

Cast
 

 Chris Pratt as:
 Emmet Brickowski, an everyman, construction worker, and a Master Builder from Bricksburg and Lucy's boyfriend.
 Rex Dangervest, a self-proclaimed "galaxy-defender, archaeologist, cowboy, and raptor trainer." He is eventually revealed to be Emmet's nihilistic future self. His character is based on Pratt's most famous roles. 
 Elizabeth Banks as Lucy / Wyldstyle, a Master Builder and Emmet's girlfriend.
 Will Arnett as Bruce Wayne / Batman, a DC Comics superhero who is a Master Builder.
 Tiffany Haddish as Queen Watevra Wa'Nabi, the shape-shifting alien queen of the Systar System that was made by Emmet as a heart. Her name is a pun on the phrase "whatever I want to be", itself a descriptor of her shape-shifting abilities, which are displayed when she changes into multiple forms throughout the movie.
 Stephanie Beatriz as General Sweet Mayhem, an intergalactic mini-doll who serves as the intergalactic naval commander and law enforcer of the Systar System Armed Forces. She is the right-hand woman to Queen Watevra Wa'Nabi.
 Charlie Day as Benny, a Master Builder who is a spaceship-obsessed 1980s spaceman. In contrast to the previous movie, he has a metallic arm.
 Alison Brie as Princess Unikitty / Ultrakatty, a Master Builder who is a unicorn-horned cat. In this film, instead of turning red when angry, she is red right from the outset. Over the years since the first film, she has developed the ability to become a giant version of herself called "Ultrakatty" when combat is about to occur.
 Nick Offerman as MetalBeard, a Master Builder who is a large bionic pirate with a severed head after he lost his original body in an earlier encounter with Lord Business' forces.
 Jadon Sand as Finn, a young teenager in the real world, whose imagination drives the events happening in the Lego universe.
 Brooklynn Prince as Bianca, Finn's younger sister, who is the reason why the aliens from the planet Duplo attacked Bricksburg.
 Maya Rudolph as Mom, the unnamed mother of Finn and Bianca. She is the force in the real world that brings about "Armamageddon" ("Our mama gets in"). She was previously voiced by Amanda Farinos in the first film.
 Will Ferrell as:
 President Lord Business, the former President of the Octan corporation and the Lego World, who served as the main antagonist of the first film.
 The Man Upstairs, a Lego collector who is Finn and Bianca's father. Outside of re-used footage from the first film, Ferrell does not appear on-screen in this role, performing only in an off-screen voiceover.
 Richard Ayoade as "Ice Cream Cone", a talking ice cream cone and citizen of the Systar System who serves as Queen Watevra Wa'Nabi's aide.
 Channing Tatum as Superman, a DC Comics superhero, and one of the Master Builders.
 Jonah Hill as Green Lantern, a DC Comics superhero, and one of the Master Builders.
 Cobie Smulders as Wonder Woman, a DC Comics superhero who is an ambassador of the Amazon people as well as a Master Builder.
 Jason Momoa as Aquaman, a DC Comics superhero who is the king of Atlantis and is also a Master Builder. Momoa reprises his role from the DC Extended Universe.
 Margot Rubin as:
 Harley Quinn, a Gotham City criminal, girlfriend to The Joker and Master Builder. She was previously voiced by Jenny Slate in The Lego Batman Movie.
 Susan, a mini-doll, and one of Queen Watevra Wa-Nabi's servants.
 Mermaid, an inhabitant of Apocalypseburg.
 Wonder Woman mini-doll, an inhabitant of Harmony Town.
 Panda, a panda-masked inhabitant of Apocalypseburg.
 Ike Barinholtz as Lex Luthor, a DC Comics villain, Master Builder and arch-enemy of Superman. Strangely, he and the Man of Steel have somehow become best friends after being brain-washed by the Queen.
 Ralph Fiennes as Alfred Pennyworth, a DC Comics character and Master Builder who is Batman's loyal Butler.
 Will Forte as Abraham Lincoln, the 16th President of the United States and a Master Builder.
 Bruce Willis as himself, a Lego caricature of the actor who appears in several scenes, including a running joke alluding to his character John McClane from the 20th Century Fox Die Hard franchise.
 Ben Schwartz as Banarnar, a sentient banana peel who is a citizen and the perpetual jester of the Systar System.
 Jimmy O. Yang as Zebe, a lavender and black zebra who is a citizen and the bus driver of the Systar System.
 Noel Fielding as Balthazar, a sparkly-faced teenage vampire, spa expert, and DJ from the planet Sparkle in the Systar System describing himself as an "attractive and non-threatening teen vampire." He is a nod to Edward Cullen from The Twilight Saga.
 Jorma Taccone as Larry Poppins, a male counterpart of Mary Poppins.
 Gary Payton as Himself, a Lego caricature of the basketball player who Emmet encounters in Apocalypseburg.
 Sheryl Swoopes as Herself, a Lego caricature of the basketball player who Emmet encounters in Apocalypseburg.
 Trisha Gum as Velma Dinkley, a member of Mystery Inc. from the Scooby-Doo franchise.
 Todd Hansen as:
 Gandalf, a wizard from Middle-earth and a Master Builder. Hansen had voiced the same character in The Lego Movie.
 The Swamp Creature, a gill-man from Lego Monster Fighters and a Master Builder. He is also a recurring character from The Lego Movie.
 Doug Nicholas as Chainsaw Dave, a citizen of Apocalypseburg who was formerly known as Surfer Dave.
 Mike Mitchell as:
 Sherry Scratchen-Post, a cat lady who is a citizen of Apocalypseburg.
 A royal guard that works for Queen Watevra Wa'Nabi.
 "Eight", an octopus who does massages and works at the spa in the Palace of Infinite Reflection.
 A Harmony Town citizen
 An announcer who announces the guests on the bride and groom's side
 An Apocalypseburg warrior.
 Christopher Miller as:
 Chad, a citizen of the Systar System who is the DJ of the Pop-Up Party Bus under the stage name Tempo.
 A horse
 A talking chocolate bar that resides in the Systar System.
 Plantimals, plant-like creatures in the Systar System that live in the jungles near Harmony Town.
 Paper Boy, a resident of Harmony Town.
 Steve, a character in Minecraft
 Emily Nordwind as Cleopatra, an Egyptian queen and Master Builder.
 Chris McKay as "Larry", a barista that works in Apocalypseburg.
 Ralph Halprin as "Dolphin Clock," an orbiting clock in the Systar System that is based on Bianca's actual clock.

Additionally, the characters of Bad Cop / Good Cop (now known as Scribble Cop) and Vitruvius' ghost return, but they have only brief lines of dialogue and are voiced by uncredited actors in place of Liam Neeson and Morgan Freeman.

Production

Development

On February 3, 2014, Jared Stern was hired to write the sequel, along with Michelle Morgan. On March 12, 2014, Deadline reported that animation co-director Chris McKay would direct the sequel with Phil Lord and Christopher Miller as producers. On April 10, 2014, it was reported that McKay wanted to have more women in the sequel than men. On July 28, 2014, it was reported that Chris Pratt wanted to return to reprise his role as Emmet. It was also reported that Will Arnett might return to reprise his role as Batman, but hadn't decided.

In October 2014, Warner Bros. scheduled The Lego Batman Movie for 2017, and The Lego Movie 2 for May 25, 2018. On October 25, 2014, it was reported that Lord and Miller had signed on to write The Lego Movie 2. On October 30, it was announced that Australia-based animation studio Animal Logic was in talks to produce the next three Lego films (though the deal was not finalized at the time) and the New South Wales government would make financial contributions to all the films. On November 12, during an interview with BBC News, Lord and Miller revealed that there would be more female characters featured in the film.

On February 24, 2015, the sequel was retitled The Lego Movie Sequel and Rob Schrab was announced as the film's director, replacing McKay as director as he was scheduled to direct The Lego Batman Movie instead. By November 2015, Miller announced that the first draft of the script was completed. Subsequent rewrites were provided by Raphael Bob-Waksberg, Dominic Russo and Matthew Fogel. By February 2017, Schrab had been replaced by Mike Mitchell, reportedly due to "creative differences". Production started in Canada on October 2, 2017. In an interview with Collider for the press day for The Lego Ninjago Movie, producer Dan Lin confirmed that Lord & Miller were rewriting the script during production. He also said that the sequel was going to include more songs due to the success of competing Disney musical films like Frozen and Moana.

The production of the film took advantage of Animal Logic's latest update to its trace renderer, Glimpse, to improve on-screen detail and depth-of-field. Miller stated that he will dedicate the film to his mother, Charlotte "Charie" Miller, who born in July 1949 and who died in December 2018, two months before the film's release.

Writing
The Lego Movie 2s narrative begins after the events of the first film, just as Finn's toddler sister Bianca starts to play with Duplo blocks and tries to take over Bricksburg. In the intervening years, Bianca has taken more of the Lego sets to incorporate into her own creations. The animation team recognized that girls would likely not only use Lego bricks but also incorporate other materials, such as fabrics and paper, creating a challenge for their rendering team. They wanted these elements to appear as if a child was manipulating them through their stop-motion animation process. They explored multiple design styles for each playset that is within Bianca's room, the "Systar System", and developed new animation approaches for some of these styles, including using fewer frames as in inbetweening.

They also incorporated the Lego Friends line of toys aimed at girls, which include mini-dolls like General Sweet Mayhem. However, unlike traditional Lego mini-figurines, the Lego Friends' mini-dolls do not have the same articulation, for example, having no separate leg movement or wrists that rotate. The production team, working with Lego, did not want to create walking and movement patterns that did not match the articulation the real figurines could do, and came up with creative solutions for animating these in the film. This also created a challenge for at least one song and dance number; production brought in a choreographing team to help plan out the dance taking into account for the restrictions of movement for the mini-figures. For Queen Watevra Wa-Nabi, the production team decided to simply assign a pile of random Lego bricks for her, but required that each of the forms that she could shape-shift into used only those bricks from that pile.

According to Lord and Miller, each Lego Movie takes place in the imagination of a child that represents the real and Lego worlds. Miller explained that the directors wanted to have its story be "more complicated and sophisticated". With The Lego Movie 2, both Finn and Bianca's imaginations drive certain scenes, and the creators opted to leave the film's vague parts if the scene was based on Finn's version, Bianca's version, or some combination.

Among the mini-figures within the film is one based on Supreme Court Justice Ruth Bader Ginsburg. Lord and Miller had considered figures that would be unexpected within the film, with Ginsburg as one of their ideas. They received Ginsburg's blessing for this appearance, though she did not perform any voice work for this role. Subsequently, the Ginsburg mini-figure would then be made as part of the film's toy line.

Casting
On March 23, 2018, it was reported that Tiffany Haddish had been cast in the film to voice a new lead character, while returning actors would be Pratt as Emmet, Elizabeth Banks as Wyldstyle, Arnett as Batman, Channing Tatum as Superman, and Jonah Hill as Green Lantern. Stephanie Beatriz and Arturo Castro were announced to be part of the film on June 4, 2018. Castro was replaced by Richard Ayoade in the final film. During San Diego Comic Con 2018, it was announced that Pratt would also voice a new character in addition to Emmet, Rex Dangervest, who is based after Pratt himself. In November 2018, Maya Rudolph joined the cast. In early January 2019, it was revealed that Jason Momoa would reprise his role as Aquaman from the DC Extended Universe. Gal Gadot was to also reprise her role as Wonder Woman from the DC Extended Universe, replacing Cobie Smulders from the previous film, but Smulders ended up returning shortly before the film's release.

Daniel Radcliffe was originally set to voice a look-alike of his Harry Potter known as Larry Potter, but his scene was ultimately cut. It was revealed by Mitchell that Radcliffe's cameo was deleted due to not wanting to risk anything that would upset the Harry Potter fandom. The character was replaced by Larry Poppins (another look-alike character based on a British media icon).

Music

Following the attempt to create an earworm with the first film's "Everything Is Awesome", the producers of the film created a similar song for the sequel, titled "Catchy Song", which principally features as its only lyric the repeated phrase "This song's gonna get stuck inside your head". The song was written by Jon Lajoie, and recorded by Dillon Francis, featuring T-Pain and Alaya High (the latter under her stage name That Girl Lay Lay). According to Lajoie, he found that "Everything is Awesome" was "annoyingly catchy", and the only way that they could outdo that was "Dial the 'annoying' up to 11!".

Mark Mothersbaugh, who composed the first film's soundtrack, as well as the score for The Lego Ninjago Movie, returned to compose the score for the sequel. Both the soundtrack and score albums were released by WaterTower Music on February 7, 2019, a day before the film's release.

Marketing and release
The marketing campaign for The Lego Movie 2: The Second Part cost $100 million. Promotional partners included Chevrolet, Chiquita, McDonald's, Discover Card, and Turkish Airlines. Like The Lego Movie, Lego released a number of building toy sets based on scenes from The Lego Movie 2. Warner Bros. released a Christmas-styled short film, Emmet's Holiday Party, in December 2018. The Lego Movie 2 Videogame was released in February 2019 on multiple platforms.

The Lego Movie 2: The Second Part premiered on February 2, 2019, at the Regency Village Theatre in Los Angeles. It was originally scheduled for general release in the United States on May 26, 2017, but the film was pushed back to May 18, 2018, and later to February 8, 2019. The film was released one day earlier in Denmark.

Warner Bros. Home Entertainment released The Lego Movie 2: The Second Part for digital download on April 16, 2019, and on DVD, Blu-ray and 4K formats on May 7. Physical copies contain behind-the-scenes featurettes, audio commentary, deleted scenes, and the short Emmet's Holiday Party.

Reception

Box office
The Lego Movie 2: The Second Part grossed $105.8 million in the United States and Canada and $86.5 million in other territories, for a worldwide total of $192.5 million.

The Lego Movie 2 was released with What Men Want, Cold Pursuit, and The Prodigy on February 8, 2019. It earned $8.5 million on its first day, including $1.5 million from Thursday night previews. The film debuted earning $34.1 million from 4,303 theaters, but its opening was lower than The Lego Movie by 50 percent. Deadline Hollywood attributed the low opening to franchise fatigue due to the release of two spin-offs prior to The Lego Movie 2, as well as Warner Bros. promoting the film using similar marketing tactics from the first film, leading audiences to assume the sequel as derivative and indistinguishable from its predecessor.

Critical response
The website's critical consensus reads, "While it isn't quite as much fun as its predecessor, The LEGO Movie 2: The Second Part fits neatly into an animated all-ages franchise with heart and humor to spare". On Metacritic, the film has a weighted average score of 65 out of 100, based on 52 critics, indicating "generally favorable reviews". Audiences polled by CinemaScore gave the film an average grade of "A−" on an A+ to F scale (lower than The Lego Movie "A"), and PostTrak rated it 4 out of 5 stars; social media monitor RelishMix noted their online responses were "great".

Jesse Hassenger of The A.V. Club called the film "lovable", giving it a grade of B and writing "Like Brad Bird's recent Incredibles 2, it follows up a dazzling animated original (all the more dazzling for earning that designation despite being based on a toy line) with some big ideas that don't cohere with the same streamlined magic as its predecessor." Yolanda Machado of TheWrap commended the screenplay and directing and wrote that the film "expands on the original's premise, adding new worlds and characters to the growing LEGO universe, while also crafting a story that is timely, inventive, hilarious and perfect for all ages."

Chris Nashawaty of Entertainment Weekly says that while it was better than most other films it didn't recapture the surprise of the first film, saying "Everything is still awesome. Just a little bit less so." For The Hollywood Reporter, Michael Rechtshaffen wrote that the film brought "little that's fresh or funny to the interlocking brick table despite boasting a script penned by originators Phil Lord and Christopher Miller."

Accolades
The Lego Movie 2: The Second Part earned several nominations for Best Animated/Family Film from the Golden Trailer Awards, the Movieguide Awards (which it won), the Nickelodeon Kids' Choice Awards, and the People's Choice Awards. Pratt and Haddish's performance received nominations for each Kids' Choice Award, with Pratt for a People Choice Award. At the 3rd Hollywood Critics Association Film Awards, its "Catchy Song" was nominated for Best Original Song. The film was nominated for the Outstanding Visual Effects in an Animated Feature at the 18th Visual Effects Society Awards.

Future
Following The Lego Movie 2s disappointing box office returns, Warner Bros. allowed their film rights with Lego to expire. Lego entered negotiations with Universal Pictures for a new first-look deal. Dan Lin was expected to remain as producer through his company Rideback. In April 2020, the deal with Universal was set for a five-year film deal.

On August 8, 2022, Dan Lin revealed that a third film of the series titled The Lego Movie 3 is in development. Lin promises that the creative team has "reinvented" the LEGO world for the third film, but it does not yet have a release date.

Notes

References

External links
 
 Official website at Lego.com
 
 
 

2010s adventure comedy films
2010s American animated films
2010s English-language films
2019 3D films
2019 comedy films
2019 computer-animated films
2019 films
Alien invasions in films
American 3D films
American action comedy films
American adventure comedy films
American animated feature films
American children's animated adventure films
American children's animated comic science fiction films
American children's animated science fantasy films
American computer-animated films
American fantasy adventure films
American films with live action and animation
American sequel films
Animal Logic films
Animated crossover films
Animated films about time travel
Animated post-apocalyptic films
Animated superhero comedy films
Films about dysfunctional families
Films about sentient toys
Films about siblings
Films based on toys
Films directed by Mike Mitchell
Films produced by Dan Lin
Films produced by Phil Lord and Christopher Miller
Films produced by Roy Lee
Films scored by Mark Mothersbaugh
Films shot in Sydney
Films with screenplays by Christopher Miller (filmmaker)
Films with screenplays by Phil Lord
Lego DC Comics films
Lego DC Comics Super Heroes films
Lego films
The Lego Movie (franchise)
Metafictional works
Vertigo Entertainment films
Warner Animation Group films
Warner Bros. animated films
Warner Bros. Animation animated films
Warner Bros. films